Remigija Nazarovienė (née Sablovskaitė; born 2 June 1967 in Ashkabad, Turkmen SSR) is a retired Lithuanian heptathlete. She won the bronze medal at the 1997 World Championships and finished third at the 1998 IAAF World Combined Events Challenge. She won the Talence Decastar twice, in 1996 and 1997, and was runner-up in 1989 and 1998. She competed at three consecutive Olympic Games (1988 to 1996), three consecutive World Championships in Athletics (1995 to 1999), ad four straight editions of the European Athletics Championships (1990 to 2002). 

She holds the Lithuanian national record in heptathlon with 6604 points, and also held national records in the 100 m and 60 m hurdles.

After retirement as a heptathlete, she started coaching in Estonia. In 2009, her student, decathlete Mikk Pahapill, won the heptathlon at the European Indoor Championships.

International competitions

National championships

Personal bests

Outdoors

Indoors

Coaching
After her retirement as a heptathlete, Remigija Nazarovienė started coaching in Estonia. She currently coaches Mikk Pahapill. She has coached also decathletes Andres Raja, Mikk-Mihkel Arro, Artur Liiv and heptathletes Kaie Kand, Ksenija Balta, Ebe Reier, Berit Jürgenson.

Decathlete Mikk Pahapill won European Indoor Championships in 2009 and heptathlete Ksenija Balta won Bronze medal at the European Junior Championships in 2005.

Personal life
Her father was a javelin thrower with the result of 78.32 m, and her mother was 12.0-second 100 m performer. Her son Deividas is currently playing basketball.

Nazarovienė was married to Andrei Nazarov, an Estonian decathlete who finished tenth at the 1995 World Championships. She is the sister-in-law of Lithuanian discus thrower Virgilijus Alekna.

Honorary awards
Badge of Merit from Lithuanian President Algirdas Brazauskas
Voted as a best Estonian female athletics coach in 2006
Estonian Ministry of Culture award in 2008

References

External links

1967 births
Living people
Sportspeople from Ashgabat
Lithuanian heptathletes
Soviet heptathletes
Lithuanian athletics coaches
Estonian athletics coaches
Olympic athletes of Lithuania
Olympic athletes of the Soviet Union
Athletes (track and field) at the 1988 Summer Olympics
Athletes (track and field) at the 1992 Summer Olympics
Athletes (track and field) at the 1996 Summer Olympics
World Athletics Championships athletes for Lithuania
World Athletics Championships medalists
Competitors at the 1998 Goodwill Games
Turkmenistan people of Lithuanian descent
Soviet Athletics Championships winners